Jindřich Zelený (13 November 192211 September 1997) (translation: Henry Green) was a Czech philosopher and the author of several books.

Early years
He was born in Bítovany, Czech Republic in 1922 and attended school in Chrudim and Hradec Králové. In 1948, Zeleny received a Ph.D. in philosophy and sociology from Charles University in Prague.

Career
Zelený taught at Charles University, VŠPHV, University of Economics, and Czechoslovak Academy of Sciences (CSAV) FU. In 1981, he was admitted to the CSAV.

Most of his work is published in Czech.  However, The logic of Marx, translated into English and edited by Terrell Carver, was published in 1980. Die Wissenschaftslogik bei Marx und "Das Kapital" was published 1968 in German.

Later years
Zelený retired from teaching in 1990, and died in Prague in 1997.

Partial bibliography
 Zelený, J. (1980). The logic of Marx. Translated and edited by Terrell Carver. Oxford: Blackwell. 
 Schmidt, A. (1969). Beiträge zur marxistischen Erkenntnistheorie. Aufsätze von György Márkus, Jindřich Zelený, E. W. Iljenkow, Hans-Georg Backhaus, Henri Lefèbvre, Alfred Schmidt. Frankfurt am Main: Suhrkamp.
 Zelený, J. (1968). Die Wissenschaftslogik bei Marx und "Das Kapital". Kritische Studien zur Philosophie. Translated by Peter Bollhagen. Frankfurt am Main [u.a.]: Europäische Verlagsanstalt [u.a.].

References

External links
 "On the Dialectico-Materialist Type of Rationality'', Jindrich Zeleny, Prague

1922 births
1997 deaths
Writers from Pardubice
20th-century Czech philosophers
Charles University alumni
Academic staff of Charles University
Philosophy academics
Philosophy writers
Czechoslovak philosophers